Peter Sinclair (born 19 May 1947) is a former Australian rules footballer who played with Melbourne in the Victorian Football League (VFL).

Notes

External links 

1947 births
Living people
Australian rules footballers from Victoria (Australia)
Melbourne Football Club players
University Blacks Football Club players